David Mejía Hernández (born December 7, 1986 in Toluca) is a Mexican race walker. He set his personal best time of 1:22:36, by finishing third in the men's 20 km at the 2011 IAAF Race Walking Challenge in Chihuahua, Mexico.

Mejia represented Mexico at the 2008 Summer Olympics in Beijing, where he competed in the men's 20 km race walk, along with his compatriot Eder Sánchez. He successfully finished the race in thirty-sixth place by eight seconds ahead of Italy's Jean-Jacques Nkouloukidi, with a time of 1:26:45.

References

External links

NBC 2008 Olympics profile

Mexican male racewalkers
Living people
Olympic athletes of Mexico
Athletes (track and field) at the 2008 Summer Olympics
People from Toluca
1986 births
21st-century Mexican people